Jean Batista de Andrade Pereira (born 6 March 1992), commonly known as Jean Batista, is a Brazilian footballer who currently plays as a defender for Covilhã.

Career statistics

Club

Notes

References

1992 births
Living people
Brazilian footballers
Brazilian expatriate footballers
Association football defenders
Villemomble Sports players
CS Fola Esch players
UN Käerjéng 97 players
Associação Atlética Internacional (Bebedouro) players
Barretos Esporte Clube players
Mirassol Futebol Clube players
Tombense Futebol Clube players
Atlético Monte Azul players
Rio Preto Esporte Clube players
S.C. Covilhã players
Liga Portugal 2 players
Brazilian expatriate sportspeople in France
Expatriate footballers in France
Expatriate footballers in Luxembourg
Brazilian expatriate sportspeople in Portugal
Expatriate footballers in Portugal